Zhang Ti (died 4 April 280), courtesy name Juxian, was an official of the state of Eastern Wu during the late Three Kingdoms period (220–280) of China. He was the last Imperial Chancellor of Wu. In 280, when the Jin dynasty invaded Wu as part of its strategy to reunify China under Jin rule, Zhang Ti led the Wu forces into battle to resist the Jin invasion. He was killed in action during a battle around present-day He and Dangtu counties in Anhui. In the same year, the Wu emperor Sun Hao surrendered to the Jin dynasty, thus bringing an end to the existence of Wu and the Three Kingdoms period.

See also
 Lists of people of the Three Kingdoms

References

 Chen, Shou (3rd century). Records of the Three Kingdoms (Sanguozhi).
 Pei, Songzhi (5th century). Annotations to Records of the Three Kingdoms (Sanguozhi zhu).
 Sima, Guang (1084). Zizhi Tongjian.

236 births
280 deaths
Eastern Wu politicians
Chinese chancellors
Politicians from Xiangyang
Eastern Wu generals
Generals from Hubei
Three Kingdoms people killed in battle